Joseph-Léo Kemner Laflamme,  (30 August 1893 – 10 August 1989) was a Liberal member of the House of Commons of Canada. He was born in Fitchburg, Massachusetts, United States, the son of Edmund K. Laflamme and Célina Blais.

Laflamme moved to Canada in 1898 and was educated at Commercial College in Montmagny, the Quebec Seminary and at Université Laval where he attained a Bachelor of Arts. He was appointed King's Counsel in 1930 and was a Crown attorney in 1935 and 1940. Laflamme also partially owned the Levis newspaper La Laurentienne.

He was first elected to Parliament at the Montmagny riding in the 1925 general election then re-elected there in 1926. Laflamme was defeated by Armand Lavergne of the Conservative Party in the 1930 election. After riding boundaries were changed in 1933, Laflamme returned to Parliament with an election victory at the Montmagny—L'Islet riding in 1940. After serving a final term, Laflamme did not seek another federal term in the 1945 election.

Electoral record

References

External links 
 

1893 births
1989 deaths
American expatriates in Canada
Lawyers in Quebec
Liberal Party of Canada MPs
Members of the House of Commons of Canada from Quebec
Politicians from Fitchburg, Massachusetts
Canadian King's Counsel